The Oates Building (former home of the Oates-Corley Furniture Company) is a historic site in Lakeland, Florida. It was designed by architect Edward Columbus Hosford in the Mission Revival and Spanish Colonial Revival styles.

The Oates Building is located at 230 South Florida Avenue. On July 28, 1995, it was added to the U.S. National Register of Historic Places.

Gallery

References

External links

 Polk County listings at National Register of Historic Places
 Oates Building at Florida's Office of Cultural and Historical Programs

Buildings and structures in Lakeland, Florida
National Register of Historic Places in Polk County, Florida
Edward Columbus Hosford buildings
Spanish Colonial Revival architecture in Florida